Phrynobatrachus petropedetoides, the Ruwenzori river frog or Ruwenzori puddle frog, is a species of frog in the family Phrynobatrachidae. It is found in the eastern Democratic Republic of the Congo, southwestern Uganda, and extreme western Tanzania, although its precise distribution is uncertain. It has been treated as a junior synonym of Phrynobatrachus dendrobates, but is currently treated as a valid species.

Phrynobatrachus petropedetoides occurs in montane forest, usually above  of elevation. Breeding presumably takes place in water.

This species is threatened by habitat loss (deforestation) caused by agricultural activities, wood extraction, and the expansion of human settlements. Mining is also a potential threat. It is present the Itombwe Natural Reserve, although this does not offer sufficient protection.

References

petropedetoides
Frogs of Africa
Amphibians of the Democratic Republic of the Congo
Amphibians of Tanzania
Amphibians of Uganda
Amphibians described in 1924
Taxa named by Ernst Ahl